Henry Richards may refer to:

 Henry Richards (priest) (1747–1807), clergyman and academic administrator at the University of Oxford
 Henry Brinley Richards (1817–1885), Welsh composer
 Henry Caselli Richards (1884–1947), Australian geologist
 Henry deCourcy Richards, American architect
 Henry Charles Richards (1851–1905), British Member of Parliament for Finsbury East
 Henry Richards (Queensland politician) (1821–1868), member of the Queensland Legislative Assembly
 Henry Erle Richards (1861–1922), professor of law and diplomacy
 Henry Richards (soldier) (1812–1864), British Army officer
 Henry Richards (cricketer) (born 1967), New Zealand cricketer

See also

 Harry C. Richards (1908–1980), American horse racing jockey
Henry Richard (1812–1888), minister and politician